Dana Barron is an American actress who is best known for her role as the original Audrey Griswold in the 1983 film National Lampoon's Vacation which she reprised in 2003's National Lampoon's Christmas Vacation 2: Cousin Eddie's Island Adventure for NBC television.

Early life
Barron was born in New York City. Her mother, Joyce McCord, is a stage actress. Her father, Robert Weeks Barron, was a director of commercials and a Congregationalist church pastor; Robert founded The Weist-Barron School of Television, the first commercial and soap opera acting for television school in the world. Barron has a sister named Allison. She is a fifth generation entertainer. Her grandfather was an opera singer, and her mother moved from Alabama to become an actress.

Career
Barron's sister, Allison, had been doing TV commercials at a young age, and Barron told her father that she wished to do the same. She began acting at age 10, doing TV commercials as well. By age 11, she was appearing with Christine Baranski in Hide and Seek on Broadway. By age 13, her first film  was the horror film He Knows You're Alone, with Tom Hanks, which was also Hanks' first film.

In 1983, Barron starred in the Chevy Chase comedy National Lampoon's Vacation, originating the role of Audrey Griswold. The film became a classic, and Barron would reprise the role 20 years later in the NBC TV movie spinoff, National Lampoon's Christmas Vacation 2: Cousin Eddie's Island Adventure.

Barron received a Daytime Emmy Award in 1989 for her appearance in the CBS after-school special No Means No. Barron appeared on the soap opera One Life to Live from 1984 to 1985 as Michelle Boudin. She starred in the 1998 The Magnificent Seven as Casey.

She had a recurring role as Nikki Witt on the Fox series Beverly Hills, 90210, during which she was able to make her character's clothes and modify her lines.

In 1992, she starred with JoBeth Williams and Chris Burke in the NBC movie Jonathan: The Boy Nobody Wanted. Barron has made guest appearances on TV shows including The Equalizer, In the Heat of the Night, Murder, She Wrote, and Babylon 5 as a telepath named Lauren Ashley in the Season 5 episode "The Corps Is Mother, the Corps Is Father".

Personal life
Barron was in a long term relationship with filmmaker Michael Vickerman. They have a son, Taylor.

Filmography

Film

Television

See also 
 Dana Plato and Dana Hill, two other American actresses named Dana that were also prominent at Barron's peak of fame.

References

External links

 
 

Living people
Actresses from New York City
American child actresses
American film actresses
American soap opera actresses
American television actresses
People from New York City
20th-century American actresses
21st-century American actresses
Year of birth missing (living people)